The 1909 German football championship, the seventh edition of the competition, was won by Phönix Karlsruhe, defeating Viktoria 89 Berlin 4–2 in the final.

For Phönix Karlsruhe it was the club's only appearance in the German championship final. Phönix would later merge with VfB Mühlburg to form Karlsruher SC, with the latter making a losing appearance in the 1956 final. Viktoria 89 Berlin, the defending champions, played its third consecutive final in 1909, having lost in 1907 and won it in 1908. Viktoria would go on to make one more final appearance, winning the competition for a second time in 1911.

Viktoria's Willy Worpitzky was the top scorer of the 1909 championship with seven goals.

Eight clubs qualified for the competition played in knock-out format, the champions of each of the eight regional football championships, Berlin sending the champions of two rival competitions to the finals.

Qualified teams

The teams qualified through the regional championships:

Competition

Quarter-finals
The quarter-finals, played on 2 and 16 May 1909:

|}

Semi-finals
The semi-finals, played on 16 and 23 May 1909:

|}

Final

References

Sources
 kicker Allmanach 1990, by kicker, page 160 to 178 – German championship
 Süddeutschlands Fussballgeschichte in Tabellenform 1897-1988  History of Southern German football in tables, publisher & author: Ludolf Hyll

External links
 German Championship 1908–09 at weltfussball.de 
 German Championship 1909 at RSSSF

German football championship seasons
1
German